Sir Geoffrey Arama Henry  (16 November 1940 – 9 May 2012) was a Cook Island politician who was twice the Prime Minister of the Cook Islands. He was leader of the Cook Islands Party (CIP) from 1979 to 2006.

Early life
Henry was a native of Aitutaki. His father was the deacon of the Cook Islands Christian Church on the island. He was also first cousin to Albert Henry.  He received a law degree from Victoria University of Wellington in New Zealand. He was married to Lady Louisa Henry.

Political career
Henry initially entered parliament in the opposition party aged 24 because of the corruption and excesses of the governing Cook Islands Party led by his cousin Albert Henry. However, in 1972 he joined the CIP: "family pressure was unbearable, and he could not personally tolerate being ostracised by the family again". Despite distrust from Albert Henry's powerful wife Elizabeth, his talent in a mediocre party meant he became finance minister.

Henry became leader of the CIP in 1979 after his cousin Albert Henry was forced to resign. Geoffrey Henry's first tenure as Prime Minister was from 13 April 1983 to 16 November 1983. From 1983 to 1989 he was the Leader of the Opposition in the Parliament of the Cook Islands. Henry's second tenure as Prime Minister began on 1 February 1989 and ended on 29 July 1999, when he resigned rather than face the break-up of the CIP due to party dissidents who opposed his leadership. Joe Williams replaced Henry as Prime Minister, but Henry remained as leader of the CIP.

In November 2004, Henry became the Deputy Prime Minister and Minister of Finance in a coalition government led by Robert Woonton. Henry continued in this position until 2006, when he retired from politics and as leader of the CIP. Henry Puna succeeded Henry as leader of the CIP.

Honours and awards
In 1977, Henry was awarded the Queen Elizabeth II Silver Jubilee Medal. On 13 June 1992, while serving as Prime Minister, Henry was appointed a Knight Commander of the Order of the British Empire (KBE) by Queen Elizabeth II.

Post-political career
On 16 April 2009, Henry was elected to a four-year term as president of the Cook Islands Sports and National Olympic Committee. The Sir Geoffrey Henry National Culture Centre in Avarua is named in Henry's honour.

On 18 February 2011 he was elected Speaker of the Cook Islands Parliament.

On 9 May 2012, Henry died at the age of 71 at his home in Takuvaine, Rarotonga. In the days preceding his death he had been receiving treatment for cancer.

2010 Air New Zealand "terrorist" incident
In August 2010, Henry was removed from an Air New Zealand aeroplane at the Auckland International Airport after Henry made a comment during boarding about being a terrorist. Henry was asked to leave the New Caledonia-bound aircraft, but was not arrested. Henry later stated that he had become angry when required by security procedures to remove his jacket a second time despite an injured shoulder; as he boarded, he joked to the flight attendant, "Somebody back there thinks I am a terrorist." Henry refused to apologise for the incident, stating that "I don’t even look like Osama bin Laden or one of his lieutenants." Henry blamed his removal from the flight on the Air New Zealand pilot, who refused to fly with Henry on board; Henry argued that the pilot overreacted and should have applied "a modicum of commonsense" to the situation.

Notes

1940 births
2012 deaths
Prime Ministers of the Cook Islands
Deputy Prime Ministers of the Cook Islands
Education ministers of the Cook Islands
Finance ministers of the Cook Islands
Knights Commander of the Order of the British Empire
Members of the Parliament of the Cook Islands
Speakers of the Cook Islands Parliament
Cook Island lawyers
People from Aitutaki
Victoria University of Wellington alumni
Cook Islands Party politicians
Deaths from cancer in the Cook Islands
Cook Island knights
Geoffrey